Mohamoud Hashi Abdi, commonly known as Ina Xaashi, is a Somali politician, who served as the Minister of Civil Aviation and Air Transport of Somaliland from July 2010 to October 2015. In October 2015, after the resignation of several cabinet ministers, he was appointed as Minister of Presidency by then president Ahmed Mohamed Mohamoud (Siilaanyo).

See also

 Ministry of Presidency
 Cabinet of Somaliland
 Ministry of Civil Aviation (Somaliland)

References

|-

Living people
Civil Aviation Ministers of Somaliland
Government ministers of Somaliland
Somaliland politicians
Year of birth missing (living people)